Floyds Island Hammock is a historic site in the swamp of the Okefenokee National Wildlife Refuge in Charlton County, Georgia.  Also known as Hebard Cabin and Floyd's cabin, it was listed on the National Register of Historic Places in 2000.  The listing included a contributing building, a contributing structure (Railroad Piling & Bed), and four contributing sites (B. Spaulding Cabin Site (9Cr36), Cook's House Site, Guide's Hut Sites (3), and 9Cr2 (Floyds Island Mound)).

References

National Register of Historic Places in Georgia (U.S. state)
Late 19th and Early 20th Century American Movements architecture
Buildings and structures completed in 1901
National Register of Historic Places in Charlton County, Georgia